West Manchester was an English association club based in Manchester.

History

The club was founded in 1884, out of a bicycle club that was based at Brooks Bar.  The club was a founder member of the Manchester Football Association.  The club's first reported match was a 3–3 draw against Haughton Dale in October 1884.

Manchester Senior Cup success

In 1887 the club won the Manchester Senior Cup.  The club twice had to replay ties which it had won.  In the first round, West beat Denton F.C. 2–0, in extra time, before 5,000 spectators at Brooks Bar.   A replay was ordered (presumably because of this extra-time period) at Pendleton Olympic and this time West won 3–0.

In the second round, the club beat Manchester F.C. 5–2,   but was disqualified because some of its players did not meet residency requirements; on appeal, the Manchester FA ordered a replay.  It is not certain whether it took place, given the limited amount of time available for the tie, or whether West Manchester won; either way, the club went through to the quarter-final, beating Stalybridge St George's 14–0.

West Manchester then beat Hurst 2–0 in the semi, before beating Newton Heath 2–1 in the final, in what was both considered a surprise and against the run of play.

FA Cup and Lancashire League

The following season the club entered the FA Cup for the first time, drawn away to Fleetwood Rangers in the first round; at 3pm, the time of the scheduled kick-off, the club had not arrived, so Fleetwood kicked off, scored, and claimed the tie.  West Manchester arrived at 4pm and the Rangers agreed to play, but only under protest as they had already claimed the tie.  The point was moot as Rangers came from behind to win 4–1.  It was the club's only appearance in the main draw of the competition.

When the Football League, the Combination, and the Football Alliance all started, West Manchester did not apply to join any of them, unlike rival clubs Newton Heath and Ardwick.  As both clubs were accepted into national competitions, West Manchester focussed on the regional game, and joined the Lancashire League.  The club rarely finished in the top half and with the focus on the national game, playing in a regional league as a professional club proved impossible.  In its final season (1896–97) the club struggled to field a team - in the final match, with Stockport County, West Manchester could only field 10 men.

After one final friendly match, post to the club secretary was being returned as unclaimed, and the club was de facto defunct.

Colours

The club played in white.

References

Defunct football clubs in England
Association football clubs established in 1884
Defunct football clubs in Greater Manchester
Association football clubs disestablished in 1897
Defunct football clubs in Lancashire